São Bartolomeu is a former civil parish in the municipality of Coimbra, Portugal. The population in 2011 was 627 in an area of 0.17 km2, meaning it's the least populated bairro in Coimbra. On 28 January 2013 it merged with Sé Nova, Santa Cruz, and Almedina to form Coimbra (Sé Nova, Santa Cruz, Almedina e São Bartolomeu). It's home to the Igreja de Santiago and Ponte de Santa Clara.

References 

Former parishes of Coimbra